Elections were held in Mimaropa for seats in the House of Representatives of the Philippines on May 13, 2013.

The candidate with the most votes will win that district's seat for the 16th Congress of the Philippines.

Summary

Marinduque
Incumbent Lord Allan Jay Velasco, the son of Presbitero Velasco, Jr., an Associate Justice of the Supreme Court of the Philippines, is going up against Regina Ongsiako Reyes, daughter of provincial governor Carmencita Reyes and sister of Toll Regulatory Board Executive Director Edmundo Reyes, Jr. Velasco won against Edmundo Reyes in 2010; however, Reyes filed an election protest but the House of Representatives Electoral Tribunal dismissed Reyes' suit and even increase Velasco's lead an additional 39 votes after recounts.

Reyes was disqualified by the Commission on Elections' First Division after it ruled that she is a naturalized American citizen, which also caused her residency to be forfeited as the commission said that "she has not abandoned her domicile of choice in the USA." Reyes is allowed to appeal the decision to the commission en banc.

Occidental Mindoro
Incumbent Ma. Amelita Villarosa is term limited. Edgardo Urieta is her party's nominee, his opponent is governor Josephine Sato.

Oriental Mindoro

1st District
Incumbent Rodolfo Valencia is term limited; Calapan city mayor Paulino Leachon is his party's nominee.

2nd District
Incumbent Reynaldo Umali is running unopposed.

Palawan
The second district of Palawan was redistricted into two districts: Puerto Princesa and Aborlan is designated as the third district, while the rest of the old second district retained that nomenclature.

1st District
Incumbent Antonio C. Alvarez is term limited; his son Franz Joseph is his party's nominee.

2nd District
Incumbent Rep. Victorino Dennis Socrates is running for the vice governorship. While his National Unity Party did not name a nominee, his local party Partidong Pagbabago ng Palawan nominated Frederick Abueg.

3rd District

Romblon
Eduardo Jesus Madrona is the incumbent.

References

2013 Philippine general election
Lower house elections in Mimaropa